The 2010 Chinese Athletics Championships was the year's national outdoor track and field championships for China. It was held from 5–8 August in Jinan. It served as the qualifying meet for China at the 2010 Asian Games. The highlight of the competition was a Chinese national record of 5.75 metres in the men's pole vault by Yang Yansheng.

Results

Men

Women

Racewalking 
The Chinese Racewalking Championships were held on 14–16 March in Huangshan.

Half marathon 
The Chinese Half Marathon Championships were held on 25 April in Yangzhou.

References

National Championships & Asian Games Trials Jinan  CHN  5 - 8 August 2010. Tilastopaja. Retrieved 2019-07-14.
Jalava, Mirko (2010-08-09). National record for Yang Yansheng in men’s Pole Vault - Chinese Champs & Asian Games Trials. IAAF. Retrieved 2019-07-14.

External links
 Chinese Athletics Association official website

Chinese Athletics Championships
Chinese Athletics Championships
Chinese Athletics Championships
Chinese Athletics Championships
Sport in Jinan